Zora may refer to:
Zora (given name), a female name of Slavic origin
Zora language, a Kainji language of Nigeria. 
Zora (spider), a genus of spider in the family Zoridae
Zora (TV series), a Kenyan soap opera-drama series
Zoras, a fictional race in The Legend of Zelda series
Zora (magazine), a literature journal published by Bosnian Serb intelligentsia
Zora, Missouri, United States
Zora, Pennsylvania, the site of a Civil War skirmish near Monterey Pass
ZORA, a website for women of color published by Medium
FK Zora, a Montenegrin football club